Toby Matthew Howarth (born 12 July 1962) is a Church of England bishop. He is the current and first area of Bishop of Bradford in the Diocese of Leeds.

Howarth was educated at Yale University and Wycliffe Hall, Oxford; and ordained in 1990. He studied at Birmingham University for his MA. His first post was a curacy at Derby, after which he was with Crosslinks in India then the Netherlands. He was a tutor at Selly Oak College from 2000 until 2004; and Priest in charge at St Christopher's Church, Springfield from then until 2011. He was then the Archbishop of Canterbury's Secretary for International Relations until his elevation to the episcopate.

References

Living people
1962 births
Bishops of Bradford
Alumni of the University of Birmingham